Márcio is a Brazilian or Portuguese male personal name

 Márcio Melo (1906-1991) general with the Brazilian air force
 Márcio Rezende de Freitas (1960) Brazilian soccer referee
 Márcio Bittencourt (1964) Brazilian footballer
 Márcio Roberto dos Santos (1969), Brazilian football player, 1994 World Champion.
 Márcio Garcia (1970) Brazilian actor, television host
 Márcio May (1972) Brazilian cyclist
 Márcio Araújo (1973) Brazilian beach volleyball player
 Márcio Amoroso (1974) Brazilian footballer
 Márcio Carlsson (1975), Brazilian tennis player
 Márcio Mixirica (1975) Brazilian footballer
 Márcio Cruz (1978) Brazilian martial artist
 Márcio dos Santos Gaia (1978), Brazilian footballer
 Márcio Careca (1978) Brazilian rugby player
 Márcio Nobre (1980), Brazilian footballer
 Márcio Abreu (1980), Portuguese footballer
 Márcio Luiz Silva Lopes Santos Souza (1981) Brazilian footballer
 Márcio Augusto dos Santos Aguiar (1981) Brazilian footballer
 Márcio Torres (1981), Brazilian tennis player
 Márcio Luiz Adurens (1981) Brazilian footballer
 Márcio Diogo (1985), Brazilian footballer
 Márcio Rafael Ferreira de Souza, commonly known as Rafinha, (1985) Brazilian footballer
 Márcio Azevedo (1986) Brazilian footballer
 Márcio Rosa (1997), Cape Verdean footballer

Portuguese masculine given names